The 1920 Mecklenburg-Strelitz state election was held on 16 May 1920 to elect the 36 members of the Landtag of the Free State of Mecklenburg-Strelitz.

Results

References 

Mecklenburg-Strelitz
Elections in Mecklenburg-Western Pomerania